The Three Words to Remember in Dealing with the End EP is the first EP by American rock band All Time Low, released in 2004 by Emerald Moon Records.

Title
Vocalist/guitarist Alex Gaskarth has stated that the "three words to remember" referred to in the title are "All Time Low" and "I love you".

Track listing

Personnel
 Alex Gaskarth – vocals, rhythm guitar
 Jack Barakat – lead guitar
 Rian Dawson – drums
 Zack Merrick – bass guitar

References

All Time Low EPs
2004 debut EPs